Kang Seok-woo (born Kang Man-heung on October 1, 1957) is a South Korean actor. He made his acting debut in 1978 in the Kim Soo-yong film Yeosu (The Loneliness of the Journey), then starred in his first television drama Ordinary People in 1982. Kang was most active on the big screen in the 1980s, but has worked exclusively in television since 1995. He has also displayed his artwork in several exhibitions.

Filmography

Film

Television series

Variety/radio show

Awards and nominations

References

External links
 Kang Seok-woo Fan Cafe at Daum 
 
 
 
 

1957 births
Living people
South Korean male television actors
South Korean male film actors
People from Seoul
Dongguk University alumni
Sincheon Kang clan
Best New Actor Paeksang Arts Award (film) winners
Best New Actor Paeksang Arts Award (television) winners